Methodist Church in India is a Protestant Christian denomination of India. 

The Methodist Church in India's roots originate in American Methodist missionary activity in India, as opposed to the British and Australian conferences of the Methodist Churches, which joined the Church of South India and the Church of North India that emerged as a result of the ecumenical merger of the Methodist Church of Great Britain, Church of India, Burma and Ceylon (Anglican) and other Protestant denominations. 

Methodism came to India in 1856. It has hundreds of thousands of members. It is a member of the World Council of Churches, Christian Conference of Asia, the National Council of Churches in India and World Methodist Council. It runs schools.
 
The Methodist Church in India (MCI), is an "autonomous affiliated" Church in relation to the United Methodist Church.

It has episcopal polity.

History

In 1856 the Methodist Episcopal Church From America started the mission in India. The Methodist Episcopal Church began its work in India in 1856, when William Butler came from America.  He selected Oudh and Rohilkhand to work in and, being unable to secure a residence at Lucknow, began work at Bareilly.  The first War of Independence broke up the work at Bareilly, but in 1858 Lucknow was occupied and Bareilly re-occupied and the work of the Mission started anew.

By  1864 the work had grown to such an extent that it was organized under the name of the India Mission Conference.  Additional stations were occupied in Oudh, Rohilkhand, Garhwal, and Kumaon, and by  1876 The Methodist Episcopal Church had established work both along evangelistic and educational lines.

Methodist Churches were established in cities including Mumbai, Kolkata, Chennai, Kanpur and Bangalore. Special revival meetings were held which led the church out of its boundaries and gave it a national status.

In 1870 marked, on the invitation of James M. Thoburn, an acknowledged leader in the Mission,  evangelist William Taylor was invited to India to hold special revival meetings.  On his arrival, he started his work at Lucknow and subsequently went to Kanpur.  The work had thus far been confined to the territory East and North of the Ganges, but by that river; this move was the first step of expansion into all Southern Asia. There came into existence Methodist congregations in Kanpur, Bombay, Poona, Calcutta, Secunderabad, Madras, Bangalore, Nagpur and other cities.

In 1873 the churches established by William Taylor were organized into the "Bombay-Bengal Mission."  In 1876 the South India Annual Conference was organized, taking in all the territory outside the bounds of the original Upper India field.  This was followed in 1888 by the organization of the Bengal Annual Conference, and in 1893 the Bombay and North-West India Annual Conferences were separated. Between 1871 and 1900 the Methodist Episcopal Church expanded to become a national Church throughout Southern and South-Eastern Asia, with work carried on in twelve languages, extending from Manila to Quetta and from Lahore to Madras; and the Christian community increased from 1,835 to 111,654.

In 1904 the field was again sub-divided by the organization of the Central Provinces Mission Conference, which was followed by setting the work of Burma apart and organizing it as a Mission Conference.  In 1921 two Annual Conferences, Lucknow and Gujarat were brought into existence and another division of the field was made in 1922 when the Indus River Annual Conference was organized.  In 1925 the Hyderabad Annual Conference was separated from the South India Annual Conference.  In 1956 Agra Annual Conference was separated from Delhi Annual Conference and Moradabad Annual Conference from the North India Annual Conference.  In 1960 the Karachi Provisional Annual Conference was organized.  Thus in 95 years from 1865 to 1960, the one Conference in India had grown into 13, covering the whole of Southern Asia.

In this period the work of the Methodist Episcopal Church spread beyond  India.  Under the leadership of James M. Thoburn, Burma was entered in 1879, where John E. Robinson became the pioneer missionary, and in 1885 the work in Malaysia was begun by the establishment of a mission at Singapore, the pioneer here being William F. Oldham.  In 1899, when the Philippines came into the possession of the United States of America,  James M. Thoburn entered Manila and established the Church; Homer C. Stuntz was one of the pioneer workers.  All these missionary leaders later became Bishops of the Church.

In 1870 the first missionaries of the Woman's Foreign Missionary Society of the Methodist Episcopal Church came.  Two young ladies arrived that year: Isabella Thoburn, to work in the education of India's girls and women, and physician Clara Swain, to work in medicine, the first female doctor to undertake such work in Asia.

Evangelistic work in the villages of northern India resulted in the baptism of large numbers of people from the deprived classes.

In 1920 the Methodist Missionary Society was organized to supervise missionary work in India. 
In 1930 the Central Conference of southern Asia elected the first national bishop. 
Since the Independence of India in 1947 all bishops have been Indian nationals. 
Missionaries were sent to Borneo in 1956 and to the Fiji islands in 1963.

Since 1928 the MCI was engaged in union negotiations in North India. 
In 1970 the Central Conference voted against the plan of union, but dialogue with the Church of North India  continued.

In 1981 the Methodist Church in India was established as an "autonomous affiliated" church in relation with the United Methodist Church. The church is now independent in organization and has adopted its own constitution and book of discipline and articles of faith.

Beliefs

The Methodist Church in India says that it understands itself as the body of Christ in and for the world as part of the Church universal. Its stated purpose is to understand the love of God as revealed in Jesus Christ, to bear witness of this love to all people and to make them his disciples.

The Methodist Church in India affirms two dominical sacraments, Holy Baptism and Holy Communion, with five additional rites being observed: confirmation, confession, matrimony, holy orders and anointing of the sick. The ordinances of feetwashing (especially on Maundy Thursday), as well as women's headcovering (usually with a shawl, chiefly a dupatta), are practiced.

Social work

The MCI runs 102 boarding schools and 155 village schools in which over 60,000 children are enrolled. 
89 residential hostels cater for 6,540 boys and girls. 
The Church also operates 19 College and vocational training institutions, 25 hospitals and health care centres, and many community welfare and development programmes in the country

Parish

Bangalore 

1. Hosanna Methodist Church,  Kelamangalam Road, Mathigiri, Hosur, Tamil Nadu

2. Indiranagar Methodist Church, 100ft Road, 13th Main Rd, HAL 2nd Stage, Indiranagar, Bengaluru

3. Sarjapura Methodist Church Marathahalli - Sarjapur Rd, beside St. Patrick's Academy, near Kodathi, Gate, Bengaluru

4. Koramangala Methodist Church, CA30/A, 15th Main Rd, Koramangala 4th Block, Koramangala, Bengaluru

5. Christ Methodist Church, 3M98+CGR, Sonam Layout, Essel gardens, Bengaluru
6 . Hosa Road Methodist church 
7. Lingarajapuram Methodist church 
8. Wilson Garden Methodist church 
9. R T Nagar Methodist church
10. Grace Methodist church
11.st.Paul Methodist church
12. Hoodi Methodist church 
13. Peenya Methodist church 
14. LR nagar Methodist church
15. Mysore Methodist church 
16. RTMC

Mumbai 

Chennai

1	Emmanuel Methodist Church, 	Vepery, Chennai
2	Methodist Tamil Church, 	Vepery, Chennai
3	Anna Nagar Methodist Church, 	Anna Nagar, Chennai
4	Holy Trinity Methodist Church, 	Haddo, Andaman Islands
5	Methodist Tamil Church, 	Shoal Bay, Andaman Islands
6	Methodist Tamil Church, 	Bamboo Flat, Andaman Islands
7	Methodist Tamil Church, 	Namunaghar, Andaman Islands
8	Zion Methodist Church, 	        Pondicherry
9	Emmanuel Methodist Church, 	Pondicherry
10	St. John's Methodist Tamil Church	Madurai
11	Apostolic Methodist Church, 	Coimbatore
12 Emmanuel methodist Tamil Church, Pudur, Ambattur, Chennai

Bareilly 

Bareilly served as the headquarters for the Methodist Church in India, hence, the Christ Methodist Church in Civil Lines, Bareilly is the second oldest Methodist Church building in India. The oldest being in Nainital, Uttarakhand.

Delhi

Uttar Pradesh

Lucknow 

|7 || Wesleyan Methodist Church
28/29 Nehru Road, Cantt Lucknow.

Kanpur

Gandhinagar (Gujarat)

Ahmedabad (Gujarat)

Nagpur (Maharashtra)

Bhopal (Madhya Pradesh)

Nanded District (Maharashtra)

See also 

Christianity in India

References

Further reading
 Badley, Brenton T. The Making of a Bishop: The Life of Bishop Jashwant Chitambar (Lucknow, India: Lucknow Publishing House, 1942).
 Hollister, John Norman. The Centenary of the Methodist Church in Southern Asia (Lucknow Publishing House, 1956). 
 Latourette, Kenneth S. Christianity In A Revolutionary Age A History Of Christianity In The Nineteenth And Twentieth Centuries Volume III The Nineteenth Century Outside Europe The Americas The Pacific Asia And Africa (1961) pp 400–415. online

 Latourette, Kenneth S. Christianity in a Revolutionary Age Vol. 5, The 20th Century outside Europe  (1962) pp 299–331.
 Locke, Russ M. "A Methodist Family In India: A History Of I. Amar Chitambar and Family." (Doctor of Ministry thesis, Claremont School Of Theology, Proquest Dissertations Publishing, 1978. 781534 online, pp. 40-54 on Jashwant Rao Chitambar.
 Moffett, Samuel Hugh. A History of Christianity in Asia, Vol. II, 1500–1900 (2005) . By 
 Pickett, J. Waskom. The Methodist Church in India. (1939).
 Thoburn, James M. The Christian conquest of India (1906) online

Methodism in India
Religious organizations established in 1856
1856 establishments in India
1856 establishments in British India
Affiliated institutions of the National Council of Churches in India